The BL 4-inch gun Mk VII was a British high-velocity naval gun introduced in 1908 as an anti-torpedo boat gun in large ships, and in the main armament of smaller ships. Of the 600 produced, 482 were still available in 1939 for use as coastal artillery and as a defensive weapon on Defensively Equipped Merchant Ships (DEMS) during the Second World War.

Naval history 
The guns armed the following warships :
 s, laid down 1906
 s, laid down 1907
  scout cruisers, laid down 1907
 , laid down 1909
  battleships, laid down 1909
 s, laid down 1909
 s, laid down 1909
 s, laid down 1909
 Bristol-class light cruisers, laid down 1909
  scout cruisers, laid down 1909
  scout cruisers, laid down 1910
  battleships, laid down 1911

The gun was succeeded in the "heavy" 4-inch class on new warships commissioned from 1914 onwards by the QF 4-inch Mk V. This new generation of warships were more heavily armed, and the BL Mk VII's role as secondary armament on capital ships and primary armament on cruisers was taken over by the BL 6-inch Mk VII and BL 6-inch Mk XII while the 4-inch calibre became the secondary armament on cruisers and primary armament on destroyers.

In World War II many guns were used to arm merchant ships.

World War I field gun service 

A battery of 4 guns mounted on field carriages was first deployed with the South African Heavy Artillery in the German South West Africa campaign in 1915 and returned to England in September. They were then deployed in the East African Campaign from February 1916 with 11th Heavy Battery (renumbered 15th Battery from April 1916) manned by the Royal Marine Artillery.

Surviving examples 

 2 Mk VII guns from HMS New Zealand outside the Auckland War Memorial Museum

See also 
 List of naval guns

Weapons of comparable role, performance and era 
 4"/50 caliber gun US equivalent

Notes

References

Sources
 HANDBOOK for the 4" Mark VII. and VIII. B.L. Guns 1913 (Corrected to September 1913.) ADMIRALTY Gunnery Branch, G.8652/13
 
 DiGiulian, Tony. British 4"/50 (10.2 cm) BL Mark VII
 Farndale, General Sir Martin. History of the Royal Regiment of Artillery : Forgotten Fronts and the Home Base 1914–18. London:The Royal Artillery Institution, 1988
 

Naval guns of the United Kingdom
World War I naval weapons of the United Kingdom
100 mm artillery